Punta Brava Lighthouse (Faro de Punta Brava), also known as Punta Carretas Lighthouse, is a lighthouse in Punta Carretas, Montevideo, Uruguay. It was erected in 1876. In 1962, the lighthouse became electric. The lighthouse is important for guiding boats into the Banco Inglés, Buceo Port or the entrance of the Santa Lucía River, west of Montevideo city.

See also

 List of lighthouses in Uruguay

References

Lighthouses completed in 1876
Buildings and structures in Montevideo
Lighthouses in Uruguay
Punta Carretas
1876 establishments in Uruguay